Harlakenden, located in Cornish, New Hampshire, was the residence of American novelist Winston Churchill, and was also the Summer White House of Woodrow Wilson from 1913 until 1915. It was destroyed by fire on October 6, 1923.

See also
 List of residences of presidents of the United States

References 

Houses in Sullivan County, New Hampshire
Presidential homes in the United States
Cornish, New Hampshire